Michaël Taupin (born 12 March 1972) is a French archer. He competed in the men's individual event at the 1992 Summer Olympics.

References

1972 births
Living people
French male archers
Olympic archers of France
Archers at the 1992 Summer Olympics
People from Champigny-sur-Marne